Dizaj Hoseyn Beyg (also Romanized as Dīzaj Ḩoseyn Beyg and Dīzaj-e Ḩoseyn Beyg; also known as Dīzaj-e Ḩoseyn Beyk, Dizaj Hosein Beik, Dīzaj Ḩosey Beyk, Dīzeh Ḩoseyn Bag, Ḩoseyn Beyg Dīzeh, Ḩoseyn Beyk Dīzeh, Hussain Beg Dīzeh, and Usenbay-Diza) is a city in Yalquz Aghaj Rural District of Koshksaray District, Marand County, East Azerbaijan province, Iran. At the 2006 National Census, its population was 3,764 in 963 households. The following census in 2011 counted 3,916 people in 1,153 households. The latest census in 2016 showed a population of 4,060 people in 1,273 households. It was the largest village in Koshksaray Rural District until 2019 when Koshksaray District was established and two rural districts were created. In addition, Dizaj Hoseyn Beyg was elevated from village to city status.

References 

Marand County

Populated places in East Azerbaijan Province

Populated places in Marand County